Fire Shut Up in My Bones is an English-language opera in three acts, with music by Terence Blanchard and libretto by Kasi Lemmons.

The opera was first performed at the Opera Theatre of Saint Louis in 2019, and is based on the 2014 memoir of the same name by Charles M. Blow.  It opened at the Metropolitan Opera in 2021, the first opera by a black composer ever performed there.

The narrative focus of the opera is on Charles, a young African-American man growing up in poverty. As he comes of age, he must decide how to deal with the sexual abuse he previously suffered at the hands of his cousin. At the climax, he decides not to take revenge. 
The opera includes flashbacks and the appearance of the protagonist's internal voices in the form of female spirits.

Background

Blanchard described Fire Shut Up in My Bones as "opera in jazz". It is the composer's second opera, following Champion in 2013. Aside from opera, Blanchard has won five Grammy Awards for his jazz records. The title of the opera, which is also the title of Blow's memoir, is a biblical reference, specifically quoting Jeremiah 20:9.

Whilst the opera's libretto and narrative reflect the content and themes of Blow's memoir, it is not a comprehensive retelling of the book. The essential elements are reflective of Charles M Blow's life. As noted by Patricia J Williams in a review of the book: "He grows up amid mean if not absolute poverty; he is molested both by a cousin and by an uncle; his father is distant, an alcoholic; and his parents separate under circumstances that involve his mother waving a gun about on more than one occasion".

Performance history
The opera made its world premiere on June 15, 2019, at the Opera Theatre of Saint Louis. The conductor of the premiere performance was William Long. Performers included Julia Bullock and Davóne Tines.

The Metropolitan Opera's 2021–2022 season opened with Fire Shut Up in My Bones on September 27, 2021.
It was the first opera by a African-American composer to be performed at the Metropolitan Opera since its founding in 1883. The conductor was Yannick Nézet-Séguin. The co-director and choreographer was Camille A. Brown. Fire Shut Up in My Bones had not been intended as a season opener at the Metropolitan Opera, but general manager Peter Gelb stated that the Black Lives Matter movement had informed his decision to move the piece to such a prominent slot. It was recorded as part of the Metropolitan Opera Live in HD film series  and the recording won a Grammy for Best Opera Recording in 2023.

The Lyric Opera of Chicago presented the opera in March/April 2022. These performances were conducted by Daniela Candillari.

Roles

Synopsis

Act 1
Charles is driving down a Louisiana road, with gun in hand, to murder his cousin Chester. Destiny entices him to go back to his childhood. The scene is now Charles's childhood. He is known as Char'es Baby. He craves attention from his stressed mother, Billie.

Billie works in a chicken factory and Charles spends time at his Uncle Paul's farm. Spinner, Billie's husband, is a womanizing spendthrift. When Billie discovers his infidelity she threatens him with a gun and tosses him out. She decides to start her life over again and move to Uncle Paul's Farm (aria: "Leave It in Road"). While Billie and Charles's brothers go to collect the spoils of an overturned meat truck, Charles dreams of a better life, collecting things from a junkyard.

At Thanksgiving, his cousin Chester comes to visit. He steals from a candy store with Charles under the pretext of showing Charles how to be a man. As Billie sees Chester and Charles are getting on well, she says both of them can sleep in the same room together. Chester molests Charles. Charles feels extreme shame and feels unable to tell anybody what happened.

Intermezzo
Charles is haunted by images of male figures at night.

Act 2
In an attempt to put his shame and anger at rest, Charles is baptized in the Baptist Church. This fails and Charles tries to confide his feelings to his brothers but they rebuff him. He flees to his abandoned house in the woods, where a mysterious voice sings to him. (aria: "Bend Don't Break"). He meets a girl named Evelyn and they have sex. His brothers proclaim that this has solved problems. Charles decides to go north and strike out on his own (aria: "Peculiar Grace") but he gets a full scholarship to the nearby Grambling State University which his mother persuades him to accept. Billie decides to start taking classes again and reflects on all she has sacrificed to support her sons.

Act 3
The act opens with a step dance. At Grambling, Charles is pledging the fraternity Kappa Alpha Psi. He is hazed by the brothers, but is accepted when he does not show pain during this ordeal. At a fraternity party, Charles meets Greta and they begin an affair. Charles reveals his secret to Greta, and Greta tells him that she is in love with another boy and that she cannot live a double life. Charles is devastated, and calls his mother. She tells him that Chester has come to visit, and Charles threatens him over the phone.

The scene changes to that at the beginning of the opera. Charles's younger self appears to tell him to forget his pain. Charles arrives at his house and finds that Chester has fled. He decides to finally reveal to his mother what happened.

Critical reception
Fire Shut Up in My Bones has received generally favorable reviews, with critics praising Blanchard's score and the "compassionate" storytelling.  James Jorden called it "an opera with legs" and predicted many future revivals. He further stated that "At its current length of two and a half hours, Fire Shut Up in My Bones is in the running for best American opera of the 21st century. Trimmed of perhaps 20 minutes... I think it would be a clear winner."

Composition
Regarding the composition, critics were divided on Blanchard's influences. Giovanni Russonello and Seth Colter Walls of the New York Times wrote that the music is generally based on Italian opera, but Blanchard's jazz influence is also audible. Describing Blanchard's music, Chris Jones of the Chicago Tribune  disagreed with other critics who emphasize Blanchard's jazz influence, saying 'Rather, under the baton of Daniela Candillari, you hear Blanchard’s driving confidence in operatic mode, both harmonic and dissident, both aware of European formative precedent and sharply critical in subtle ways."

2019 Opera Theatre Saint Louis

Reviewing the premiere for the New York Times, Anthony Tommasini described the music variety of Blanchard's score: "Restless vocal lines shift from plaintive lyrical phrases, to sputtered outbursts, to a style that seems a jazz equivalent of Italianate arioso".  Though noting that the opera tends to "melodramatic excess", Tommaisini praised the "brilliantly simple, evocative production", and singled out Julia Bullock and Davóne Tines in leading roles as "ravishing" and "terrifyingly volatile" respectively.

2021 Metropolitan Opera

In reviews of the 2021 Metropolitan Opera production, critics praised the interpretation of the lead role as the adult Charles by baritone Will Liverman, who critics described as "subtle", "nuanced" and "powerful". There were, however, concerns that he was at times overwhelmed by the orchestra.

In a review for Parterre Box Gabrielle Ferrari wrote "Blanchard's score is richly colored and beautifully orchestrated". With regard to the storytelling and characterization, she went on to say the score was written "mainly with a clear-eyed compassion for his characters, to whom he never condescends nor condemns".

Writing for Vulture, critic Justin Davidson opined in an otherwise positive review that "in their enthusiasm, composer and conductor sometimes seem to have forgotten about the singers, who struggle to be heard over all the engaging churn". Davidson also stated that Fire Shut Up in My Bones was a conventional opera which did not "blow up the genre".

Alex Ross of The New Yorker praised Angel Blue for her performance of three "inner voice" roles describing her as "soaring above the orchestra".

Walter Russell III, as the younger Charles, received acclaim from the audience and critics. He was 13 years old at the time of the production.

2022 Lyric Opera of Chicago
Chris Jones of the Chicago Tribune praised Liverman, who retained the lead role of Charles, describing his performance as having an "aching vulnerability".  In his review, Jones emphasized the "historical weight" of the opera, and called it "a voyage of considerable complexity".

2023 Grammy Award

The stage production won a 2023 Grammy for Best Opera Recording with The Metropolitan Opera Orchestra and The Metropolitan Opera Chorus, along with Nézet-Séguin, Blue, producer David Frost, baritone Will Liverman, soprano Latonia Moore Blue and Russell III, making him one of the youngest recipients of the awards at the time.

References 

2019 operas
English-language operas
LGBT-related operas
Operas
Operas based on books
Operas based on real people
Operas by Terence Blanchard
Operas set in the United States